Christoph Schubert (born February 5, 1982) is a German former professional ice hockey player. Schubert played over 300 games in the National Hockey League (NHL) for the Atlanta Thrashers and Ottawa Senators from 2005–2010.

Playing career
Schubert started his career in the junior sections of the EHC Klostersee and moved, after his junior time, to the DNL-team EV Landshut. In the 1999–2000 season, as a 17-year-old, he made his debut in the Oberliga. After EV Landshut missed promotion to the 2nd Bundesliga, he joined his home team for the following season, German championship winners the Munich Barons in the Deutsche Eishockey Liga (DEL). In two future seasons, he evolved himself to a tough defenceman with a strong slap shot. In spring 2001, the Barons finished second in the German championship. Following the conclusion of the 2001–02 season, Schubert was drafted 127th overall in the 2001 NHL Entry Draft by the Ottawa Senators. He is generally seen as a competent defenceman and a checking forward with some physical upside.

One of his greatest assets is his shot, which was measured at over 100 mph in the 2005–06 Senators' Super Skills Competition, giving him the second-hardest shot in Senators team history behind former teammate Zdeno Chára.

He scored his first career NHL goal on future teammate Martin Gerber of the Carolina Hurricanes on November 22, 2005. In the 2006–07 Super Skills Competition for the Senators, despite losing to Mike Fisher for the hardest shot, he achieved first place in the puck control relay portion.

At the beginning of the 2009–10 season, on October 2, Schubert was claimed off waivers by the Atlanta Thrashers. Schubert remained on the Thrashers roster primarily as a depth player and in 47 games scored 2 goals and 7 points.

In the following 2010–11 season, Schubert was unable to garner another NHL contract and after eight years returned to Europe, signing with Frölunda HC of the Swedish Elitserien on September 15, 2010. Contributing 4 assists in 23 games with the Indians, Schubert was mutually released from his contract and returned to his native Germany, signing a two-year deal with the Hamburg Freezers of the DEL on December 8, 2010. In November 2011, he signed a contract extension until 2015 and in July 2013, Schubert inked a new deal with the Freezers that would keep him in Hamburg until 2017.

After the owner of the Freezers, the Anschutz Entertainment Group, announced in May 2016 not to apply for a license for the 2016–17 DEL campaign, Schubert, and Moritz Fürste, a field hockey Olympic gold medalist and Hamburg native, launched an initiative to raise money to save the team. They collected more than 500,000 Euro within a couple of days, which however did not make the owner group change its mind. After the Freezers had folded, Schubert became a free agent. He opted to stay in the city of Hamburg and signed with local club Hamburg Crocodiles, a member of Germany's third-tier Oberliga, in June 2016 to serve as a team captain and join the club's front office. Schubert announced his retirement from hockey in June 2019.

International play
Schubert played for the German national team in the 2002 Winter Olympics in Salt Lake City and the 2006 Winter Olympics in Turin. The team finished out of the medal round both times.

Schubert also attended the World Championships in 2002, 2005, 2008, 2009 and 2012 and participated in the 2004 World Cup of Hockey.

Career statistics

Regular season and playoffs

International

References

External links 

1982 births
Atlanta Thrashers players
Binghamton Senators players
Frölunda HC players
German ice hockey defencemen
Hamburg Crocodiles players
Hamburg Freezers players
Ice hockey players at the 2002 Winter Olympics
Ice hockey players at the 2006 Winter Olympics
EV Landshut players
Living people
München Barons players
Olympic ice hockey players of Germany
Ottawa Senators draft picks
Ottawa Senators players
Sportspeople from Munich